The 2003–04 Oklahoma State Cowboys men's basketball team represents Oklahoma State University in the 2003–04 NCAA Division I men's basketball season. The team was led by 14th-year head coach Eddie Sutton. In 2002–03, the Cowboys finished 22–10 (10–6 in the Big 12 Conference).

Preseason 
Four transfers became eligible to play for the Cowboys this season. Joey and Stevie Graham transferred from the University of Central Florida, Daniel Bobik transferred from BYU, and John Lucas III transferred from Baylor University but did not have to sit out the required year after the Baylor University basketball scandal.

Regular season 
The Cowboys won their first four games before traveling to BYU to take on Daniel Bobik's former team and Rafael Araújo, who gave the Cowboys their first setback of the year. After six more consecutive wins, OSU lost in a blowout in their its conference game against Bob Knight's Texas Tech Red Raiders in Lubbock. The Cowboys then won 11 straight conference games before falling in double overtime to Missouri. Oklahoma State won the regular season conference championship, finishing with a record of 14-2. Until 2018-19, it was the last time a team other than the Kansas Jayhawks won the Big 12 regular-season championship outright. (Oklahoma State and Kansas shared the title in 2004-05.)

Postseason 
Oklahoma State followed up its regular season Big 12 Conference championship with the tournament championship. OSU received a #2 seed in the East Regional, where it defeated the #1 seed St. Joseph's University in the regional final with the game-winning shot coming from John Lucas III. At the Final Four, the Cowboys fell to Georgia Tech on a last-second shot by Will Bynum.

Roster

Big 12 Conference standings

Schedule

Team players drafted into the NBA

References 

Oklahoma State
Oklahoma State Cowboys basketball seasons
NCAA Division I men's basketball tournament Final Four seasons
Oklahoma State
2003 in sports in Oklahoma
2004 in sports in Oklahoma